The Hollywood Arms is a Grade II listed public house at Hollywood Road, Chelsea, London.

It was built in 1865, and the architect is not known".

References

Pubs in the Royal Borough of Kensington and Chelsea
Grade II listed pubs in London
Commercial buildings completed in 1865
19th-century architecture in the United Kingdom
Chelsea, London